Lee Christopher Trundle (born 10 October 1976) is an English footballer who plays as a striker for Cymru South side Ammanford. He also works as the club ambassador and youth team coach for Championship side Swansea City.

Trundle's career began in the English non-league system, where he played for Burscough, Chorley, Stalybridge Celtic, Southport and Bamber Bridge, before signing for Welsh Premier League side Rhyl. He managed to net 15 goals in 18 matches for Rhyl, and his performances earned him a move to Football League side Wrexham in 2001. Trundle made a name for himself in professional football during a four-year spell for Swansea City, where he scored 78 goals in 146 appearances between 2003 and 2007. In July 2007, he left Swansea and signed with Bristol City, though he only scored 8 times in 3 seasons and was loaned out to both Leeds United and back to Swansea.

In 2010, following his release from Bristol City, Trundle returned to the top tier of Welsh football and signed for Neath. He spent two years with the club, scoring 26 goals in 59 matches, but found himself a free agent once more when Neath were liquidated in 2012. In a surprise move, Trundle rejoined the Football League in the summer of 2012 at the age of 35, signing for League One side Preston North End. However, a lengthy injury saw him lose out on a first team position, and he left Preston in February 2013 through a mutual termination of his contract. Stints with non-league clubs Chester and Marine followed before Trundle retired from football at the age of 36. However, in August 2016, he came out of retirement to sign for Welsh Division Two club Llanelli Town, scoring 86 goals in 59 appearances during back-to-back promotions. In May 2018, Trundle signed for Welsh Division One side Haverfordwest County on a week-by-week basis.

Early life
Born in Liverpool, Merseyside, Trundle attended St Edmund of Canterbury Catholic High School in Huyton.

Playing career

Early career
Trundle was a late entrant into professional and league football, playing for non-league teams Burscough, Stalybridge Celtic, Southport, Bamber Bridge and Chorley before joining Welsh Premier League club Rhyl in 2000.

Wrexham
Within six months, he had been snapped up by Brian Flynn to play for Wrexham where he played 78 matches (plus a further 24 as substitute) in all competitions and scored 30 goals in a little over two years. A goalscoring account which was started by a bicycle kick to start a second half comeback from 2–0 which culminated in a 3–2 victory for Wrexham against Walsall on 24 February 2001.

Swansea City
In the summer of 2003, Trundle received a free transfer and moved south to link up with Flynn who had now become manager of Swansea City. He instantly became a North Bank favourite with his goalscoring exploits and extraordinary tricks, scoring on his debut at the Vetch against Bury, and netting his first hat-trick for the club in the following match at Cheltenham, becoming the last of the three Swansea players who scored hat-tricks in three consecutive league matches, the only time this has happened for the club. Trundle scored 78 goals in 146 appearances for Swansea, making it by far the most prolific period of his career.

In his time at Swansea, Trundle became a minor celebrity in the match, with his extrovert displays of skill (or "showboating") bringing him to national attention via the Soccer AM television show on Sky Sports. Tim Lovejoy revealed in his autobiography that Trundle himself regularly contacted the show with footage of himself in action.

In October 2005, he was the subject of a £750,000 transfer bid by Sheffield Wednesday which Swansea rejected. Days later, he signed an image rights contract with his club which offered a portion of revenues from merchandise featuring his image. He was believed to be the first player outside the Premier League to do so.

Bristol City
Despite the best efforts of Swansea City, Trundle agreed to sign for Bristol City on 27 July 2007, although the deal was not officially completed until 30 July due to an administrative error. He was given permission by Swansea and the Welsh FA to play in Bristol City's pre-season friendly against Yeovil Town before he officially completed the deal, scoring and providing an assist in a 2–2 draw at Ashton Gate. It is believed Bristol City made four offers for the striker. Their final offer of £1,000,000 was accepted after Trundle handed in a transfer request. Trundle scored his first goals, a brace, for Bristol City against Scunthorpe on 25 August 2007.

Leeds United
Trundle joined Leeds United on a one-month loan on 9 January 2009 and was allocated the number 35 shirt. Former Swansea teammate Andy Robinson played a big part in recommending Leeds to Trundle. He made his debut for Leeds as a second-half substitute in the 2–0 loss to Carlisle United at Elland Road. He scored his only goal for the club on his first starting appearance, in a 2–0 win at Brighton on 17 January. Leeds extended Trundle's stay at Elland Road for a further month, but his loan expired on 10 March 2009 and he returned to Bristol City.

Return to Swansea

On 27 August 2009, Trundle joined his former club Swansea City on loan until 1 January 2010 and this was later extended till the end of the season. Trundle played 20 league games and scored five goals in just two starts. Since Trundle rejoined Swansea, he failed to play a full 90 minutes. Trundle made no secret that he wanted to earn a permanent deal and wanted to end his career at Swansea City. He was not offered a playing contract by the club but was offered a coaching role. Trundle subsequently refused the role.

Neath
In July 2010, Trundle returned to the Welsh Premier League with Neath, making his debut for the club on the opening day of the 2010–11 season in a 2–1 defeat to Bangor City.

Neath were wound up at the end of the 2011–12 season due to ongoing financial problems, leaving Trundle without a club.

Preston North End
On 20 July 2012, Trundle signed a one-year deal with Preston North End. Trundle had impressed on trial at Deepdale after being invited to join up with the club for pre-season training. The 35-year-old featured for North End in their pre-season friendlies against Southport and Chorley and scored a superb solo goal in the draw against Chorley. However, shortly after signing for the Lilywhites, it was announced he had suffered a knee injury which manager Graham Westley believed would keep Trundle out for around 4 months. On 1 December, he appeared on the bench for a Second Round FA Cup tie at home against Gillingham, and he came off the bench in injury time during the 2–0 win for the Lilywhites.

He left Preston on 8 February through a mutual termination of his contract.

Chester
It was announced on 18 February 2013 that the 36-year-old signed for Conference North side Chester until the end of the 2012–2013 season.

Marine
On 28 March 2013, Northern Premier League side Marine confirmed that they had completed the signing of Trundle for an undisclosed fee. On 30 March 2013 he scored on his debut on against Nantwich Town. All 3 games he appeared in were played at home. Trundle left Marine and retired from competitive football at the end of the season.

Llanelli Town
On 21 August 2016, Trundle came out of retirement to sign for Welsh Football League Division Two club Llanelli Town. On 27 August 2016, he scored a hat-trick on his debut in a 3–2 win against Aberdare Town. This was the first of nine hat-tricks across the season in all competitions for the veteran striker, as Llanelli went on to lift both the Division Two title and the Welsh Football League Challenge Cup. Trundle continued his impressive form in his second season at the club, scoring 33 goals in 28 appearances across all competitions as Llanelli won the Division One title by 15 points. However, the team missed out on a 'double-double' by losing 2–1 to third-tier Trefelin BGC in the final of the Welsh Football League Challenge Cup. Following Llanelli's promotion to the Welsh Premier League, Trundle announced on Twitter that he would be leaving the club as his work commitments as club ambassador for Swansea City would prevent him from travelling to away games further afield.

Haverfordwest County
On 29 May 2018, Welsh Division One side Haverfordwest County announced that Trundle had agreed to join them for the 2018–19 season. He made his debut for the club on 18 August 2018, scoring four goals in a 10–1 home win over Pontypridd Town. Trundle left the club in December 2018 due to work commitments, having scored 12 goals before his departure.

Trefelin BGC
In December 2018, Trundle signed for Welsh Division Three side Trefelin BGC. Trundle had previously represented Trefelin's veterans' team. He scored on his debut against Trethomas Bluebirds.

Ammanford
In June 2019 he joined Ammanford.

Coaching career
On 25 June 2013, it was confirmed that Trundle was to return to Swansea City, to take on the role as the first official club ambassador and a coach for the 9- to 19-year-olds.

Career statistics 
Source:

Honours

Club

Wrexham
FAW Premier Cup: 2000–01, 2002–03

Swansea City
Football League Trophy: 2005–06
FAW Premier Cup: 2004–05, 2005–06

Llanelli Town
Welsh Football League Division One: 2017–18
Welsh Football League Division Two: 2016–17
Welsh Football League Challenge Cup: 2016–17

Individual
PFA Team of the Year: 2003–04 Third Division, 2004–05 Football League Two, 2005–06 Football League One

Personal life
Trundle has been an Everton fan since he was a child.

In March 2007, Trundle moved in with pop singer and Atomic Kitten star Liz McClarnon. The couple split in November 2007.

Trundle also performed 'Let it Snow' for Preston's 2012 Christmas light switch on, before turning on the lights alongside singers, Matt Cardle and Russell Watson.

References

External links

Welsh Premier profile

1976 births
Living people
People from Huyton
Footballers from Liverpool
Association football forwards
English footballers
Burscough F.C. players
Chorley F.C. players
Stalybridge Celtic F.C. players
Southport F.C. players
Bamber Bridge F.C. players
Rhyl F.C. players
Wrexham A.F.C. players
Swansea City A.F.C. players
Bristol City F.C. players
Leeds United F.C. players
Neath F.C. players
Preston North End F.C. players
Chester F.C. players
Marine F.C. players
Llanelli Town A.F.C. players
Cymru Premier players
English Football League players
English people of Irish descent
Haverfordwest County A.F.C. players
Swansea City A.F.C. non-playing staff
Association football coaches
Ammanford A.F.C. players
Trefelin BGC players